Sergio Ángel Berti (born 17 February 1969) is an Argentine retired professional footballer, nicknamed La Bruja, who played as a midfielder.

Club career
Born in Villa Constitución, Santa Fe, Berti began his career in 1988 with popular club Boca Juniors. In 1990, he found his way out of la Bombonera in a transfer to fierce rival River Plate. The red stripe was indeed the club he spent most of his career with, not to mention short spells in between for Parma and Real Zaragoza. At River, Berti lived the golden era winning five titles including three domestic tournaments, the Copa Libertadores 1996 and the 1997 Supercopa Sudamericana. In 1999, Mexican club América acquired total ownership of his rights.

In the Copa Libertadores 2000, when América came to visit his former club Boca Juniors for the first leg match of the semifinals, just minutes before the start of the game Berti withdraw from playing, arguing being scared for the safety of his family and himself based on the chants of the Barra of Boca Juniors. America lost that game 4–1 and Berti never played again with America. In 2001 Berti returned to Argentina and signed for recently promoted team Huracán. The following year, he had a brief stint at Barcelona SC of Ecuador.

His career came to an abrupt end in 2002 at the Scottish Premier League side Livingston after spitting at teammate Richard Brittain, during a pre-season friendly.

International career
Berti was capped in 22 matches and scored one goal for Argentina, including two appearances during the 1998 FIFA World Cup and converting his penalty in the shoot-out against England in the Second Round. He was also a member of the national team that participated in Copa América 1995 and Copa América 1997.

References

External links
 Argentine Primera statistics at Fútbol XXI  
 
 

1969 births
Living people
People from Constitución Department
Association football midfielders
Argentine people of Italian descent
Argentine footballers
Boca Juniors footballers
Club Atlético River Plate footballers
Serie A players
Parma Calcio 1913 players
La Liga players
Real Zaragoza players
Liga MX players
Club América footballers
Al Ain FC players
Club Atlético Huracán footballers
Barcelona S.C. footballers
Livingston F.C. players
UAE Pro League players
1998 FIFA World Cup players
1995 Copa América players
1997 Copa América players
Argentina international footballers
Argentine Primera División players
Argentine expatriate footballers
Argentine expatriate sportspeople in Italy
Expatriate footballers in Italy
Argentine expatriate sportspeople in Mexico
Expatriate footballers in Spain
Argentine expatriate sportspeople in Spain
Expatriate footballers in Mexico
Argentine expatriate sportspeople in Ecuador
Expatriate footballers in Ecuador
Argentine expatriate sportspeople in Scotland
Expatriate footballers in Scotland
Sportspeople from Santa Fe Province